Kick Me may refer to:

Kick Me (film), 1975
Kick Me (song) by Sleeping With Sirens, 2014